The Geography of Australian rules football describes the sport of Australian rules football played in more than 60 countries around the world. By 2017 more than 26 nations had contested the Australian Football International Cup the highest level of worldwide competition. However, the sport is only played professionally and of significance in Australia itself, mainly in the states of Victoria, South Australia, Western Australia and Tasmania. Elsewhere, the sport remains extremely minor.

While Australia still accounts for the overwhelming majority of players worldwide, the sport outside of Australia has grown rapidly since the 1980s, from just a few hundred players in a handful of clubs and countries to a record 170,744 (compared to Australia's 549,400) by 2017. Prior to the COVID-19 pandemic, the sport outside of Australia was growing at a rate of 25% per annum (compared to Australia's growth rate of 10%) with the majority of this growth coming from the Asia Pacific region. Countries outside of Australia now account for almost a third of the sport's total players. Only a fraction of these players have access to a pathway to play the sport professionally, as such the majority of professional players still come from Australia. Despite these obstacles, since the 2010s internationally developed players have begun to register matches at international, professional level or both, including Hewago Oea (Papua New Guinea/AFL) and Danielle Marshall (United States/AFLW).

The first tournament to feature a national side (New Zealand) was the 1908 Jubilee Australasian Football Carnival. The first recognised contest between two open level national sides was between Papua New Guinea and Nauru in front of a crowd of over 10,000 at Sir Hubert Murray Stadium in Port Moresby which was won by PNG by 129 points. There are now several large 18 or 16 a side international tournaments, the biggest worldwide being: the Australian Football International Cup (2002-), AFL Europe Championship (2010-), Asian Australian Football Championships (1999-) and 49th Parallel Cup (1999-).

The first ever full international match involving Australia was played in 1977 at under 17 level against Papua New Guinea in Adelaide, with Australia taking the honours. Australia has, however, never competed at open international level, though since the 2000s it began to participate in matches against the senior teams of South Africa (2007-2010) and New Zealand (2012-2019) as the development AFL Academy side and state amateur teams have also contested these and other countries and composite World XVIII teams. In addition, indigenous and multicultural teams from Australia have competed internationally including the Flying Boomerangs in the Pacific region and a Indigenous & Multicultural (OzIM) composite amateurs team into the 2011 Australian Football International Cup.

Australian rules football is played professionally by men and women in Australia. It is a major spectator sport in a handful of countries, including but not limited to: Australia and Nauru.

Players of Australian rules football 
There have been several players in the VFL/AFL who were born outside Australia and since 1982, an increasing number of players have been recruited from outside Australia through initiatives such as the Irish experiment and more recently, international scholarship programs.  Despite the amateur competitions outside of Australia, no player from these competitions has yet debuted in the AFL Premiership Season.  Some have, however, featured in semi-professional competitions in Australia as well as in AFL pre-season practice matches. 

The international growth of Australian rules in the 19th century and early 20th century was rapid, but it went into rapid decline following World War I.  After World War II, the sport experienced a small amount of growth in the Pacific region, particularly in Nauru, Papua New Guinea and New Zealand.

Australian Football emerged as an international sport much later than other forms of football, such as soccer or rugby, but has grown substantially as an amateur sport in some countries since the 1980s.  Initially, the sport grew with the Australian diaspora, aided by multiculturalism and assisted by exhibition matches and players who have converted to and from other football codes.  In Papua New Guinea, New Zealand, South Africa, and the United States, there are many thousands of players.  Canada, Japan, Denmark, and Sweden have also shown strong potential in the sport in the lead up to the 2008 Australian Football International Cup.

The AFL became the de facto international governing body for the sport when created the AFL International Development Committee and the IAFC was dissolved between 2002 and 2006.

Australian Football is played professionally by men, in Australia, and is the dominant spectator sport, with the exception of exhibition games staged in other countries.

The game is played in many countries, the Australian Football League and has more than 13 affiliated international governing bodies, AFL Canada, Danish Australian Football League, BARFL, AFL Japan, ARFLI, Nauru Australian Football Association, New Zealand AFL, USAFL, AFL South Africa, AFL PNG, AFL Samoa, Tonga Australian Football Association and AFL Germany. The league also has working relationships with bodies in additional countries, who have sent, or may in future send, teams to the International Cup. In 2010, a European association of 18 Countries was founded which later re-branded as AFL Europe. This association is affiliated to the Australian Football League, which funds the retention of a regional manager in Europe.

History of Australian rules football within Australia

Australian rules football traditionally has seen its greatest support in Western Australia, South Australia, Victoria, Tasmania, the Northern Territory and the Riverina region of New South Wales.

Prior to the establishment of the AFL in 1990, leagues were generally state-specific, with the Victorian Football League slowly beginning to expand prior to this point.

Since becoming a national league, the AFL has continued its attempt to grow in the rest of Australia, with the success of teams in those areas helping to fuel interest in the game.

History of Australian rules outside Australia

Early beginnings

Almost as soon as the game was becoming established in Australia, it had spread to New Zealand and South Africa, initially because of the Otago Gold Rush and Witwatersrand Gold Rush.  The game was further fuelled in South Africa by Australian soldiers in the First and Second Boer Wars.

There were reports of early competitions in England, Scotland, and Japan, started by expatriate Australians and servicemen.

The First World Governing Body and international competition

 
In New Zealand, where proximity to Australia saw a formidable league, the sport quickly grew to a sizeable 115 clubs by the turn of the 20th century.  As the game spread, it became known as Australasian Football, with delegates from New Zealand added to the newly formed Australasian Football Council.

In 1905, a schoolboys competition had been established in Canada which led to a successful tours of Australia in 1912.
In 1906 delegates from newly formed clubs in South Africa requested a representative match against the VFL featuring players from clubs in Johannesburg, Pretoria and Durban, which the Victorian league replied it would consider, however the proposed match did not proceed.

Nationalist agenda of the VFL and AFC
Post-Federation of the Australian colonies, the game's governing bodies became highly insular in their approach. In particular, until the middle of the century, the game's premier leagues, the newly formed and increasingly professional VFL (and to a lesser extent the South Australian league), were preferential in the support they provided to overseas competitions to those areas perceived to pose the least potential threat to their status. They had become staunchly opposed to the game's development in larger first world nations. Faced with the growth of British sports and their increasing professionalism in Australia and growing interest around the world in the Australian game the Australasian Football Council (led by the VFL) implemented a domestic policy for game development in 1906. The Council's policy reflected the strong Australian nationalism of the time "one flag, one destiny, one football game" - that as the national code, all matches should be played under an Australian flag, with an Australian manufactured ball where possible on Australian soil, by the whole nation. The Council believed it could better defend its premier position in Australia by allocating all its promotional resources to grow its marketshare in New South Wales and Queensland whilst its coexistence with rugby and the promise of a universal football code was part of its ambition of keeping growth of the game in Australia under its national (and international) control. While it allowed voting member New Zealand to send a team to the 1908 Melbourne Carnival, the policy meant no touring sides and the phasing out of financial support which stymied the game outside Australia creating significant financial and logistic barriers for overseas sides to compete. The nationalistic policies were reinforced by the 1908 Prime Ministerial speech of former player Alfred Deakin delivered at the opening of the 1908 carnival and would underpin the governing body's international policy for more than half a century.

In 1907, then Australasian Football Council president Con Hickey declared that despite the game being played overseas the primary focus should be on inter-state competition and that there was no intention to attempt to "oust rugby" in places where it was growing in popularity. Despite rapid growth, the Council allocated just 20% of its funds to promote the game internationally, entirely for New Zealand, but with the majority to promote the game in New South Wales (50%) and Queensland (30%). The move would prove short-sighted as the promotional effect of the code switch of Dally Messenger, known for displaying spectacular Victorian Rules-like skill, proved a devastating blow and facilited the rapid rise of rugby league in New South Wales.

In 1908, New Zealand defeated both New South Wales and Queensland at the Jubilee Australasian Football Carnival, an event held to celebrate 50 years of Australian Football.

In 1910, a schoolboys competition was introduced to the United States which within a year had grown to dozens of schools and international competition with Australia.

Decline and hiatus
World War I saw the game being played by Australian servicemen around the world, particularly in Egypt, and in Europe in France, Belgium, and England.

It is generally believed that international interest and support for Australian rules football died following World War I, though there is evidence of a small continuous supporter base spanning several decades and that the administrators of the game, at least in Victoria, had showed very little if any interest in promoting the sport overseas. By 1920, it was obvious to Australian observers that the game in outside Australia was struggling, with Sydney rugby league commentators in Sydney gloating that the Australian code had all but died in South Africa and New Zealand, while the rugby codes in contrast, through strong assistance from Britain, were now thriving.

Nauru after the war had already become established as a national sport with thriving senior and junior local competitions.

International competition in the sport became non-existent for three quarters of the 20th century. The return of many Australian expatriates from overseas gold fields and tours of duty, combined with Australia's low profile on the world stage, offered few opportunities for the game to grow during this time. With the withdrawal of its New Zealand delegates, the sport returned to the title of Australian Football, governed by the Australian Football Council. Concerned primarily with the growth of their own domestic competitions, the Australian leagues and governing bodies made little effort to develop or promote the game until the 1950s, and the council's role was mainly to oversee the growing importance of interstate test matches.

Nevertheless, the longest running fixture outside of Australia, the annual Varsity match between Oxford and Cambridge in England, has been held since 1921, and has emerged into a fierce rivalry, worthy of half-blue status at Oxford.  Apart from this match, however the game was rarely played in England.

Revival

Australian Football was also introduced to the Territory of New Guinea in 1944 and the Territory of Papua in 1948.

World War II saw some servicemen play the game overseas, particularly in Malaysia, Indonesia, Egypt, and Algeria.  During the Vietnam War, matches were even played by servicemen against the local Vietnamese.

In the 1960s, Australian leagues began to show some interest in expansion of the game outside of Australia.  1963 saw the first Australian rules football exhibition matches played in the United States.  Australian state leagues began occasionally promoting themselves in this way over the following decades.

In 1967, it was reported in the VFL Record's "Footy Facts" column that Australian football clubs existed in Johannesburg, Pretoria, and Cape Town and that the VFL was optimistic about the future of the game in South Africa. Little is known of how or when these clubs had formed or what later became of them.

Since 1967, there have been many matches between Australian and Irish teams, under various sets of hybrid, compromise rules. In 1984, the first official representative matches of International rules football were played, and these games have continued to be played annually each October, now attracting considerable public interest, drawing sizable crowds, and receiving regular television coverage. New Zealand resumed a local competition in 1974.

The first full international test played between the national sides of Papua New Guinea and Nauru in front of a crowd of over 10,000 at Sir Hubert Murray Stadium in Port Moresby was won by PNG by 129 points. This was followed by the first ever full international match involving Australia was played in 1977 at under 17 level against Papua New Guinea in Adelaide, with Australia taking the honours.  Since then, Australia have been peerless in the sport and seldom compete at international level.

Despite these advancements and others to the international aspects of the game, progress overseas is rarely covered in the Australian media.

1980s and '90s
In the late 1980s, successful VFL exhibition matches attracted large crowds and spawned fledgling local competitions in both Japan and Canada.  The Australian media showed only a token interest in the matches in London and Japan involving VFL clubs.  It was during this decade that the sport was first televised in North America and the United Kingdom.

Some nationalities respond well to less formal means, however, and many trends in sporting activities are achieved outside formally organized programs.  For instance, although Australian football was not formally established in Tonga until 2003 however informal matches had been introduced to schools as early as 1985.

Game spreads
The largest barriers to growth of Australian Football internationally have traditionally been distance, field availability, and player numbers.  With a total of 36 players normally required for a game, and a cricket sized oval, organising games can be difficult in countries where space is a premium and devotees are spread widely.  While these factors have not been a problem in Papua New Guinea or New Zealand, they did pose large problems to leagues in Europe, Asia, and the Americas.  This disadvantage has been turned into an advantage with some organisers accepting modified versions of the game, such as nine-a-side, requiring fewer players and less space.

In the late 1980s, as organisers adapted, amateur leagues were established in Japan (1987), England, Denmark, and Canada (1989).  In the case of Japan and Canada, these were directly sparked by VFL exhibition matches.

In the 1990s, the Australian diaspora had spread and amateur competition had grown in countries such as Sweden (1993), Germany (1995), the USA (1996), Argentina, Spain,  Samoa (1997), and South Africa (1998), as well as a number of mainly expatriate teams, mainly based in South East Asia.

In 1993, interest in South Africa increased to the point where plans were made for powerful WAFL club Subiaco and Norwood from the SANFL to play two games in Johannesburg in 1994.

During this time, the VFL expanded to become the AFL and began to command a greater national and international audience.  Word of the sport grew out of AFL exhibition matches, cult television followings, and Internet communication.  North American fans formed an organisation, AFANA, specifically to work for improved media coverage of Australian Football.

The traditionalists in the governing bodies of Australia (which became the AFL) were reluctant to sanction any games which were not played exactly according to the Laws of the Game, and the AFL initially did not recognise leagues that played the game on fields that did not closely match the proper dimensions, or had less than 16 players per side. Since the 1990s, these attitudes have changed somewhat, and the AFL and other development bodies have directly contributed to the development of the game overseas.

Formation of a world governing body
The International Australian Football Council (IAFC) was formed after football first featured at the Arafura Games in 1995. Since 1998, the Barassi International Australian Football Youth Tournament, endorsed by the AFL as part of its International Policy, has hosted several junior teams from other countries.

Since 2000, fledgling competitions have been established in countries such as Ireland (2000), Tonga (2002), Scotland, France, and China (2005). Television and the internet have since helped to increase the awareness of the game outside of Australia.

Inspired by successful Arafura Games competitions, the inaugural Australian Football International Cup was held in Melbourne in 2002, an initiative of the IAFC and the AFL.  The first International Cup also marked the beginnings of a very small media interest in the international aspects of the game in Australia.

At the 2002 International Cup, meetings held between the AFL, IAFC, and international teams saw a unanimous vote amongst member countries that the AFL become the de facto world governing body for the sport, with the leagues linked to the teams affiliating with the AFL.  The IAFC's public relations officer, Brian Clarke, disputed this move and continued the organisation in name.  This organisation was finally dissolved in 2005, dropping all public claims to being the world governing body for the sport and being replaced by the development organisation Aussie Rules International.

21st century

In recent years, the game has grown particularly strongly in Papua New Guinea and New Zealand.  In  percentage terms, their increases are high in comparison to the growth of the sport in Australia, and their total player numbers are at least 100,000, making senior competition involving Australia at open level unlikely for some time.

In 2004, a volunteer group known as World Footy News began documenting the growth of Australian football internationally through their website, becoming a major source of international football news, and for the first time providing a source of detailed coverage for the International Cups (2005 and 2008).  Its website states that it "was created to foster awareness of Australian Football around the globe and to aid communication between clubs, leagues and individuals playing and supporting Aussie Rules".  At various times between 2004 and 2007, other regularly updated sources included OziRulzGlobal, Fourth Quarter, and with slowly improving quantity, an International Leagues section of the AFL website.

In 2005, after eight years of growing domestic competition, the South African government declared Australian Football to be the sport for "the new South Africa", injecting government funding into the sport.

In 2006, Pakistan, Indonesia, Catalonia, Croatia, Norway, Bermuda and East Timor joined the list of playing nations.

On 3 July 2006, the AFL announced that it had formed an International Development Committee to support overseas leagues. The AFL hopes to develop the game in other countries to the point where Australian football is played at an international level by top-quality sides from around the world. The AFL plans to host the International Cup regularly every three or four years, beginning in 2008, the 150th anniversary of the code.  Following the AFL's interest in the internationalisation of the game, coverage in the Australian media grew substantially.

On 14 April 2007, the Australian Institute of Sport Under 17 squad competed against the South African national Australian rules football team in the first international match between the two countries at North West Cricket Stadium in Potchefstroom, South Africa. The Australians won  by a score of 162-12.  In the same month, a massive junior program called "FootyWILD", similar to Auskick, was launched in the country.

On 25 April 2013, the first premiership match outside of Australia was held at Westpac Stadium in Wellington, New Zealand, between the Sydney Swans and the St Kilda Saints, and attracted a crowd of over 22,000 spectators. In the two subsequent years crowds at this event dwindled, and the matches in New Zealand were scrapped after 2015.

Historic Participation
In 2007 there was a total of 34,845 players.

In 2016, about 106,000 people played in structured competitions outside of Australia and at least 20 leagues that are recognised by the game's governing body, exist outside Australia.

The sport in 2017 had a record 170,744 registered players outside Australia (11% of total players) growing at a rate of 25% per annum.

International competition

The first truly international competitor in Australian Football was New Zealand.  In 1908, the Jubilee Australasian Football Carnival was held to celebrate the 50th anniversary of Australian rules football.  New Zealand (then representing a total of 115 clubs) defeated both New South Wales and Queensland in the carnival, but lost to Victoria and Tasmania.

The 1995 Arafura Games, held in Darwin, Northern Territory, Australia became the first international sporting event to have Australian football as a competition sport, rather than a demonstration sport. Papua New Guinea won the gold medal and retained it in subsequent games.  Other teams that have competed at Australian Rules in the games include Japan, Nauru, and a Northern Territory indigenous team.  The International Australian football Council (IAFC) was formed after the 1995 Games.

Inspired by successful Arafura Games competitions, the inaugural Australian Football International Cup was held in Melbourne in 2002, as the last act of the IAFC, and held in conjunction with the AFL. The 2002 cup was contested by eleven teams from around the world, made up exclusively of non-Australians.  Ireland won, defeating Papua New Guinea in the final.

In the interim years, Japan and New Zealand played an annual game as a curtain raiser to the AFL games. The New Zealand national team were victorious by 100 points in 2003, and so, in 2004, a club side from Auckland played the game, which Japan lost by two points.  The amateur Australian Convicts also toured, playing several matches against sides from developing nations.

The second Australian Football International Cup was held in Melbourne in 2005, again under the guidance and funding of the AFL, with New Zealand defeating Papua New Guinea in the final. Third place went to the United States of America.

In 2001 The United States, Great Britain, Denmark and Ireland competed in the Atalantic Alliance Cup. This was fore runner to other European competitions starting with the EU Cup which became the Euro Cup and also the Central European Australian Football league Championships .

In 2006, Denmark, Sweden and Germany competed in a tri-nations series, which was planned to be repeated annually.

The third Australian Football International Cup was held in 2008 by the AFL in Melbourne, with a record 16 teams competing. Papua New Guinea won their first title, defeating New Zealand, and South Africa controversially defeated Ireland by 1 point to finish third.

The fourth Australian Football International Cup was held in 2011 by the AFL in Melbourne and Sydney, with a record 18 teams competing. Ireland won their second title by defeating Papua New Guinea who have appeared in every AFL International Cup grand final.

Other international competitions that included some  Australian expatriates are also held, including the EU Cup, which was first held in 2005 in London, featuring ten teams. In 2007 the Cup was held in Hamburg, with twelve teams.

In 2013 the East Asia Australian Football League was formed  with Cambodia, Malaysia, Thailand, Vietnam, Singapore, Jakarta and Laos competing. 
Also the South China Australian Football League consists of three teams from Hong Kong, Macau, Landau and Gangzhou.

World rankings

Although the AFL is regarded as the world governing body, it does not publish statistics for matches that it does not specifically sanction. By 2009, the only attempt to consolidate all world rankings was created by the World Footy News website, which for 2008 listed 22 countries, from Australia (1st) through to India (22nd). Detailed criteria were given as to whether a country qualified for consideration, though ultimately the rankings were listed as unofficial, and are only noteworthy because of the lack of any other system. The unofficial 2008 Australian Football World Rankings.

International rules Australia vs Ireland 

A series of hybrid International rules matches between the Australian Football League's best professional players and a representative Gaelic football team from Ireland's Gaelic Athletic Association amateur players is staged annually.  The rules are a compromise between the two codes, using a round ball and a rectangular field.  The fierce tackling of the Australian code is allowed, although this has caused controversy with the Irish players. The series have remained evenly matched with the Irish using speed and athleticism, and the Australians strength and power — both inherent skills in their respective codes.

International promotion, funding & governance 
The International Australian football Council (IAFC) was formed in 1995 by a subset of playing countries to promote and develop Australian football internationally, before unanimously dissolving in favour of the AFL in 2002.

The AFL has stated that it does not see the need for a FIFA style governing body until at least 2050, so it sees its role as primarily responsible for worldwide funding and governance. Despite this, it allocates a tiny fraction of its revenue with the majority (tens of millions) going to New South Wales and Queensland as has been the case for the majority of the code's development finding since the 1890s. This disparity has seen the AFL's commitment to growing the code outside of Australia has been questioned both within and outside of Australia. It has also been questioned for spending large amounts of money promoting alternative sports such as AFLX and International Rules Football over Australian rules in an attempt to increase the league's appeal overseas.

In the mid-2000s, it provided around $30 million for development of the game in Australia and around A$500,000 annually for international development, with the following breakdown in 2005:

New Zealand $150,000
South Africa $100,000
United States of America $90,000
Papua New Guinea $45,000
Other $115,000

Including AFL exhibition and NAB Cup matches, indigenous and AIS youth tours, International Cup funding and staff funding, this will have risen to around A$2,000,000 annually by 2008.  Additional support for countries such as South Africa is leveraged through contacts with industry, and is increasingly adding to the total investment.

Much of the additional international promotion of the game is fuelled by exhibition matches, expatriate Australians, local leagues, and various AusAID projects.  The internet is seen as a key tool in keeping diverse Australian football communities in contact.

High profile advocates
Although international football has a low profile within Australia, the issue is getting increased media exposure as several high-profile Australians have become advocates for international football. High profile Australian Football identities that are involved in, have expressed interest in or are passionate about international footy at some stage include Ron Barassi, Kevin Sheedy, Jim Stynes, Paul Roos, Robert DiPierdomenico, Michael Long, Garry Lyon, Peter Schwab, Guy McKenna, Glenn Archer, Jason McCartney, Wayne Schwass, and Mal Michael. Other players who have expressed views or interest on the topic include David Rodan, Alipate Carlile, Jimmy Bartel, Jason Akermanis, Aaron Edwards, and Brad Moran.  Former AFL players Mark Zanotti and John Ironmonger have been directly involved in living and establishing clubs overseas. Other non-players such as John So, Eddie McGuire, and Tiffany Cherry have also expressed interest in the media about the game being played or watched overseas.

Women's competitions

Australia has had many women's leagues at both state and local level for decades. The first semi-professional women's Australian football league, the AFLW was founded in late 2016, after the AFL had conducted several exhibition matches over the previous few years. The inaugural season, held in 2017 was considered a huge success by the AFL. The league expanded multiple times between 2019 and  2022, and now each AFL club has both a men’s and women’s team.

Internationally, women's Australian football is played at amateur level in several countries, particularly in the United Kingdom, North America and parts of Europe and Asia. and a dozen teams have represented their nations at one or more Australian Football International Cup since 2011. Ireland and Canada have dominated thus far, being the only teams to contest the women's grand final in the competition. Ireland's team, nicknamed the Banshees, are the most recent winners, defeating Canada by just four points in the grand final of the 2017 tournament.

Junior competitions
Several countries now have youth Australian rules programs in place. These countries include Papua New Guinea, New Zealand, Samoa, Tonga, Nauru, Denmark, South Africa, England, Indonesia, the United States, and Canada. The number of participants is quite high in PNG, RSA and NZ generally dependent on the level of AFL funding but some "private" endeavours in Canada and the UK have produced significant results.

Since 1998, the Barassi International Australian Football Youth Tournament, endorsed by the Australian Football League as part of its International Policy, has hosted several of these nation's representative youth teams.

The first fully representative junior international Australian football outside of Australia was played between England and Denmark in Farum, Denmark, in October 2005. The Jakarta Bulldogs Australian Football Club, founded in 2006 by Alf Eddy, was an Australian Football Club made up of Under 18-year-old expatriate and local students in Jakarta. The team played against local teams such as the Pancawati Eagles, Depok Garudas, and the Jakarta Bintangs, and also travelled to Singapore and Malaysia in 2008 and 2009, respectively, for the Asian Australian Football Championships. The Bulldogs won the competition in both years.
Currently there is an increasing number of junior international Australian Football notably, North America, Scandinavia and the Pacific.

Specific development projects

South African AusAID project
An AusAID funded project is South African junior development began in 2003, which is assisted by aid agency Australian Volunteers International in partnership with programs such as AFL Auskick, and sponsored by Tattersalls as well as the South African North West Academy of Sport.

Aussie Rules Schools (England)
Another funded junior project is Aussie Rules Schools UK, which is funded by Sport England and co-ordinated by AFL England and AFL Europe.  This project has seen up to ten English schools adopt Aussie Rules as part of the school curriculum to combat obesity.

China AusAID project

Pacific AusAID projects
There have been full-time development officers in Tonga and Samoa, as part of AusAid projects, since 2005.

International drafts and converts

International players
Michito Sakaki from Japan became the first international player to play at AFL level when selected to play for the Essendon Football Club against the Sydney Swans at an exhibition match at North Sydney Oval in February 2006. Mike Pyke, a former Canadian rugby player, was drafted to the Sydney Swans in 2009, and played his first game in Round 7 of 2009 against Geelong, becoming the first non-Irish international player to play an official league game.

Converts

Gaelic converts to Australian football
Australia has recruited several Irish Gaelic footballers to play Aussie Rules.  As Gaelic football is primarily an amateur competition and the AFL competition is professional, there is a strong financial lure.  In the 1980s, the Melbourne Football Club recruited Jim Stynes, who would turn out to be the most successful Irish player in the history of the VFL/AFL, winning the Brownlow medal.  At around the same time, the club recruited the Scot Sean Wight.  In more recent years, the Sydney Swans recruited Irishman Tadhg Kennelly, who played in a premiership with the club and has also represented Ireland against Australia.  Carlton Football Club experimented with brothers Setanta Ó hAilpín and Aisake Ó hAilpín also Carlton Football Club has selected defender Zach Tuohy who now plays for Geelong.  The Collingwood Football Club has recruited Martin Clarke, and the Brisbane Lions recruited Colm Begley and Brendan Quigley to their international rookie list.  Due to increasing concern from the Gaelic Athletic Association, in 2006 the AFL made a deal with the GAA to limit the number of junior Gaelic drafts.

Australian football converts to American football (Gridiron)

Australia has exported players to the NFL.  Since the 1980s, many AFL players have tried out as American football punters. The special teams position requires the long range kicking skills often used by Australian football players, particularly those playing centre half-forward and full-forward.  Although the punter position is one of the least valuable on an NFL team, punters and kickers have an average salary of around US$860,000 which surpasses the wages of AFL players, who average A$221,000. As the position is less physically demanding, it has also become attractive for players heading into retirement.

International Recognition
Although Australian rules football has not yet been a full sport at the Olympic Games or Commonwealth Games, when Melbourne hosted the 1956 Summer Olympics, which included the MCG being the main stadium, Australian rules football was chosen as the native sport to be demonstrated as per International Olympic Committee rules. On 7 December, the sport was demonstrated as an exhibition match at the MCG between a team of VFL and VFA amateurs and a team of VAFA amateurs (professionals were excluded due to the Olympics' strict amateurism policy at the time). The Duke of Edinburgh was among the spectators for the match, which the VAFA won by 12.9 (81) to 8.7 (55). Australian rules was once again a demonstration sport at the 1982 Commonwealth Games in Brisbane.

A fan of the sport since attending school in Victoria, King Charles III is the Patron of AFL Europe. In 2013, participation across AFL Europe's 21 member nations was more than 5,000 players, the majority of which are European nationals rather than Australian expats.

See also

List of Australian Football Leagues outside Australia
Australian Football International Cup
List of International Australian rules football tournaments
List of national Australian rules football teams
Australian rules football exhibition matches

References

External links

News and Results Sites
 Australian Football International
 The Footy Record - Results from around the globe
 World Footy News - Independent reporting of international Australian rules football

Fan sites
 BigFooty -  International Footy Forum of the Largest unofficial Aussie Rules fan community site and forum
 AFLClubs - Social community bringing fans from around the world together.

Governing bodies
 AFL International Development
 AFL Europe

International tournaments
 Barassi International Australian Football Youth Tournament
 Australian Football International Cups 2002, 2005, 2008

International leagues
 U.S. Australian rules football League
 Women's footy USA
 DAFL - The Danish Australian Football League
 AFLG - The Australian Football League Germany

 
Australian rules football